Bleach is a 30-minute science fiction film about memory-suppressing drugs.  The short film, directed by Bill Platt, won the Directors Guild of America Student Film Award, as well as the gold medal in the narrative category of the 25th Annual Student Academy Awards.  The film also played at the 1998 Sundance film festival.

References

External links
 

1998 short films
1998 films
American student films
1998 science fiction films
1990s English-language films